Tissue plasminogen activator (abbreviated tPA or PLAT) is a protein involved in the breakdown of blood clots. It is a serine protease found on endothelial cells, the cells that line the blood vessels. As an enzyme, it catalyzes the conversion of plasminogen to plasmin, the major enzyme responsible for clot breakdown. Human tPA has a molecular weight of ~70 kDa in the single-chain form.

tPA can be manufactured using recombinant biotechnology techniques; tPA produced by such means are referred to as recombinant tissue plasminogen activator (rtPA). Specific rtPAs include  alteplase, reteplase, and tenecteplase. They are used in clinical medicine to treat embolic or thrombotic stroke. The use of this protein is contraindicated in hemorrhagic stroke and head trauma. The antidote for tPA in case of toxicity is aminocaproic acid.

Medical uses 
tPA is used in some cases of diseases that feature blood clots, such as pulmonary embolism, myocardial infarction, and stroke, in a medical treatment called thrombolysis. The most common use is for ischemic stroke. It can either be administered systemically, in the case of acute myocardial infarction, acute ischemic stroke, and most cases of acute massive pulmonary embolism, or administered through an arterial catheter directly to the site of occlusion in the case of peripheral arterial thrombi and thrombi in the proximal deep veins of the leg.

Ischemic stroke

Statistics 
There have been 12 large scale, high-quality trials of rtPA in acute ischemic stroke. A meta-analysis of these trials concluded that rtPA given within 6 hours of a stroke significantly increased the odds of being alive and independent at final follow-up, particularly in patients treated within 3 hours. However a significant mortality rate was noted, mostly from intracranial haemorrhage at 7 days, but later mortality was not significant amongst treated and non-treated patients.

It has been suggested that if tPA is effective in ischemic stroke, it must be administered as early as possible after the onset of stroke symptoms, given that patients present to an ED in a timely manner. Many national guidelines including the AHA have interpreted this cohort of studies as suggesting that there are specific subgroups who may benefit from tPA and thus recommend its use within a limited time window after the event. Protocol guidelines require its use intravenously within the first three hours of the event, after which its detriments may outweigh its benefits.

For example, the Canadian Stroke Network guideline states  "All patients with disabling acute ischemic stroke who can be treated within 4.5 hours of symptom onset should be evaluated without delay to determine their eligibility for treatment" with tPA. Delayed presentation to the ED leads to decreased eligibility; as few as 3% of people qualify for this treatment. Similarly in the United States, the window of administration used to be 3 hours from onset of symptoms, but the newer guidelines also recommend use up to 4.5 hours after symptom onset, depending on the patient's presentation, past medical history, current comorbidities and medication usage. tPA appears to show benefit not only for large artery occlusions but also for lacunar strokes. Since tPA dissolves blood clots, there is risk of hemorrhage with its use.

Administration criteria 
Use of tPA in the United States in treatment of patients who are eligible for its use, have no contraindications, and arrival at the treating facility less than 3 hours after onset of symptoms, is reported to have doubled from 2003 to 2011. Use on patients with mild deficits, of nonwhite race/ethnicity, and oldest old age increased. However, many patients who were eligible for treatment were not treated.

tPA has also been given to patients with acute ischemic stroke above age 90 years old.  Although a small fraction of patients 90 years and above treated with tPA for acute ischemic stroke recover, most patients have a poor 30-day functional outcome or die. Nonagenarians may do as well as octogenarians following treatment with IV-tPA for acute ischemic stroke. In addition, people with frostbite treated with tPA had fewer amputations than those not treated with tPA.

General consensus on use 
There is consensus amongst stroke specialists that tPA is the standard of care for eligible stroke patients, and benefits outweigh the risks. There is significant debate mainly in the emergency medicine community regarding recombinant tPA's effectiveness in ischemic stroke. The NNT Group on evidence-based medicine concluded that it was inappropriate to combine these twelve trials into a single analysis, because of substantial clinical heterogeneity (i.e., variations in study design, setting, and population characteristics). Examining each study individually, the NNT group noted that two of these studies showed benefit to patients given tPA (and that, using analytical methods that they think flawed); four studies showed harm and had to be stopped before completion; and the remaining studies showed neither benefit nor harm. On the basis of this evidence, the NNT Group recommended against the use of tPA in acute ischaemic stroke. The NNT Group notes that the case for the 3-hour time window arises largely from analysis of two trials: NINDS-2 and subgroup results from IST-3. "However, presuming that early (0-3h) administration is better than later administration (3-4.5h or 4.5-6h) the subgroup results of IST-3 suggest an implausible biological effect in which early administration is beneficial, 3-4.5h administration is harmful, and 4.5-6h administration is again beneficial." Indeed, even the original publication of the IST-3 trial found that time-window effects were not significant predictors of outcome (p=0.61). In the UK, concerns by stroke specialists have led to a review by the Medicines and Healthcare products Regulatory Agency.

Pulmonary embolism
Pulmonary embolism (blood clots that have moved to the lung arteries) is usually treated with heparin generally followed by warfarin. If pulmonary embolism causes severe instability due to high pressure on the heart ("massive PE") and leads to low blood pressure, recombinant tPA is recommended.

Recombinant tissue plasminogen activators (r-tPA) 
tPA was first produced by recombinant DNA techniques at Genentech in 1982.

Tissue-type plasminogen activators were initially identified and isolated from mammalian tissues after which a cDNA library was established with the use of reverse transcriptase and mRNA from human melanoma cells. The aforementioned mRNA was isolated using antibody based immunoprecipitation. The resulting cDNA library was subsequently screened via sequence analysis and compared to a whole genome library for confirmation of specific protein isolation and accuracy. cDNA was cloned into a synthetic plasmid and initially expressed in E. coli cells, followed by yeast cells with successful results confirmed via sequencing before attempting in mammalian cells. The transformants were selected with the use of Methotrexate. Methotrexate strengthens selection by inhibiting DHFR activity which then compels the cells to express more DHFR (exogenous) and consequently more recombinant protein to survive. The highly active transformants were subsequently placed in an industrial fermenter. The tPA which was then secreted into the culture medium was isolated and collected for therapeutic use. For pharmaceutical purposes, tPA was the first pharmaceutical drug produced synthetically with the use of mammalian cells, specifically Chinese hamster ovarian cells (CHO). Recombinant tPA is commonly referred to as r-tPA and sold under multiple brand names.

Interactions 

Tissue plasminogen activator has been shown to interact with:

 Fibrinogen alpha chain
 LRP1
 SERPINI1

Function 
 

tPA and plasmin are the key enzymes of the fibrinolytic pathway in which tPA-mediated plasmin generation occurs.

To be specific, tPA cleaves the zymogen plasminogen at its Arg561 - Val562 peptide bond, into the serine protease plasmin.

Increased enzymatic activity causes hyperfibrinolysis, which manifests as excessive bleeding and/or an increase of the vascular permeability. Decreased activity leads to hypofibrinolysis, which can result in thrombosis or embolism.

In ischemic stroke patients, decreased tPA activity was reported to be associated with an increase in plasma P-selectin concentration.

Tissue plasminogen activator also plays a role in cell migration and tissue remodeling.

Physiology and regulation 

Once in the body, tPA has three main routes it can take, with one resulting in desired thrombolytic activity (see figure). For starters, following administration and release, tPA can be absorbed by the liver and cleared from the body through receptors present therein. One of the specific receptors responsible for this processes is a scavenger protein, specifically the LDL Receptor-Related Protein (LRP1). tPA additionally can be bound by a plasminogen activator inhibitor (PAI), resulting in inactivation of its activity, and following clearing from the body by the liver. Lastly, tPA can bind plasminogen, cleaving off the bound plasmin from it. Plasmin, another type of protease, can either be bound by a plasmin inhibitor, or work to degrade fibrin clots, which is the highest utilized and desired pathway.

Synaptic plasticity 
tPA is known to participate in some forms of synaptic plasticity, in particular long-term depression and consequently mediate some aspects of memory.

Genetics 

Tissue plasminogen activator is a protein encoded by the PLAT gene, which is located on chromosome 8. The primary transcript produced by this gene undergoes alternative splicing, producing three distinct messenger RNAs.

Gallery

See also 

 Ultrasound-enhanced systemic thrombolysis

References

External links 
 History of Discovery: The Tissue-Type Plasminogen Activator Story, Collen, D., Lijnen, H.R.
 Genentech Press Release 1982
 Tissue Plasminogen Activator from the American Heart Association
 Widening the Window : Strategies to buy time in treating ischemic stroke - Scientific American (August 2005)
 Study expands window for effective stroke treatment - explained on YouTube

Antithrombotic enzymes
EC 3.4.21